The Dewoitine D.332 was a 1930s French eight-passenger airliner built by Dewoitine.

Design and development
The D.332 was an all-metal cantilever low-wing monoplane. The pilot and co-pilot were seated side by side in a cabin located forward of the wing leading edge. A radio operator station was located behind the pilots, and it had a passenger cabin for eight passengers. The landing gear had trouser-type fairings on the main gear legs.

Operations
The aircraft first flew on 11 July 1933 powered by three Hispano-Suiza 9V radial engines. The prototype was named Émeraude ("Emerald" in French) and carried out demonstration flights around European capitals. Émeraude gained a world class record on 7 September 1933 when it flew a 1,000-kilometer (621-mile) course with a useful load of 2,000 kilograms (4,410 pounds) at an average speed of 159.56 km/h (99.1 mph).

Designed to meet an Air France requirement for use on the route to French Indochina, the aircraft set out for Saigon on 21 December 1933 on a proving flight. The aircraft arrived at Saigon on 28 December 1933. On the return flight when only 400 km (250 mi) from its destination, Le Bourget airport, Émeraude struck a hill near Corbigny in a violent snowstorm and was destroyed. Despite the accident, Air France decided to order three of an improved version designated the D.333. The D.333 was a heavier and strengthened ten-seat version, the fully loaded weight being increased by 1,650 kg (3,640 lb). The three D.333s were used on the Toulouse-Dakar sector of the Air France South American route for several years. Two of these aircraft were  transferred to the Argentine Air Force after World War II and used,  along with two 338s. Argentina had a total of two of each kind

Accidents and incidents
On January 15, 1934, while flying from Lyon, France, to Paris-Le Bourget Airport outside Paris – the final leg of a flight that began on 5 January in Saigon, French Indochina, with stops at Karachi, British India; Baghdad, Iraq; Marseilles, France; and Lyons – the prototype Emeraude, operating for Air France and registered as F-AMMY, crashed in a snowstorm at Corbigny, France, killing all ten people on board including the director of Air France, Maurice Noguès, and the governor-general of the colony of French Indochina, Pierre Pasquier. The crash probably occurred due to icing.

Variants
D.332: Emeraude, prototype aircraft with eight seats. One built.
D.333: Production aircraft with ten seats. Three built.
D.338: Improved version with retractable undercarriage.

Operators

Air France

Lineas Aereas del Estado 
Fuerza Aerea Argentina

Specifications (D.332)

References

Bibliography

External links

 "Wings Over Four Continents" Popular Mechanics, December 1935 excellent photo of D.332 in flight top pp. 866

D.332
1930s French airliners
Trimotors
Low-wing aircraft
Aircraft first flown in 1933